Nurzhan Smanov (Нуржан Сманов; born February 17, 1972) is a retired boxer from Kazakhstan, who competed for his native country in the Men's Welterweight (– 67 kg) division at the 1996 Summer Olympics in Atlanta, Georgia. There he was defeated in the quarterfinals by Cuba's eventual silver medalist Juan Hernández Sierra.

References
sports-reference

1972 births
Living people
Welterweight boxers
Boxers at the 1996 Summer Olympics
Olympic boxers of Kazakhstan
Asian Games medalists in boxing
Boxers at the 1994 Asian Games
Boxers at the 1998 Asian Games
Kazakhstani male boxers
Asian Games gold medalists for Kazakhstan
Asian Games silver medalists for Kazakhstan

Medalists at the 1994 Asian Games
Medalists at the 1998 Asian Games
20th-century Kazakhstani people